Paparis is a village in the municipal unit of Valtetsi, Arcadia, Greece. It is situated on the northern slope of the mountain Tsemperou, at 670 m elevation. It is 4 km south of Athinaio, 4 km east of Anemodouri, 12 km southeast of Megalopoli and 19 km southwest of Tripoli.

Population

See also
List of settlements in Arcadia

References

External links
History and information about Paparis
 Paparis on the GTP Travel Pages

Valtetsi
Populated places in Arcadia, Peloponnese